Michael Rakowitz (born Long Island, New York, 22 October 1973) is an Iraqi-American artist living and working in Chicago. He is best known for his conceptual art shown in non-gallery contexts.

Rakowitz is Professor of Art Theory and Practice at Northwestern University, and is represented by Rhona Hoffman Gallery, Chicago; Jane Lombard Gallery, New York; and Barbara Wien Galerie, Berlin; and Green Art Gallery, Dubai. He lives and works in Chicago.

Work
Michael Rakowitz is an Iraqi-American artist and author whose work has appeared in venues worldwide. This includes dOCUMENTA (13), P.S.1, MoMA, MassMOCA, Castello di Rivoli, Palais de Tokyo, the 16th Biennale of Sydney, the 10th and 14th Istanbul Biennials, Sharjah Biennial 8, Tirana Biennale, National Design Triennial at the Cooper-Hewitt, Transmediale 05, FRONT Triennial in Cleveland, and CURRENT:LA Public Art Triennial. He has had solo projects and exhibitions with Creative Time, Tate Modern in London, The Wellin Museum of Art, MCA Chicago, Lombard Freid Gallery and Jane Lombard Gallery in New York, SITE Santa Fe, Galerie Barbara Wien in Berlin, Rhona Hoffman Gallery in Chicago, Malmö Konsthall, Tensta Konsthall, and Kunstraum Innsbruck. 

Rakowitz's work addresses the history of colonialism and extraction in museums. He has reconstructed artifacts looted from the Iraq Museum and excavation sites from diasporic ephemera such as newspapers and grocery stores.

Prizes and Awards 
He is the recipient of the 2020 Nasher Prize; the 2018 Herb Alpert Award in the Arts; a 2012 Tiffany Foundation Award; a 2008 Creative Capital Grant; a Sharjah Biennial Jury Award; a 2006 New York Foundation for the Arts Fellowship Grant in Architecture and Environmental Structures; the 2003 Dena Foundation Award, and the 2002 Design 21 Grand Prix from UNESCO. He was awarded the Fourth Plinth commission (2018-2020) in London’s Trafalgar Square. From 2019 - 2020, a survey of Rakowitz’s work traveled from Whitechapel Gallery in London, to Castello di Rivoli Museo d’Arte Contemporanea in Torino, to the Jameel Arts Centre in Dubai.

References

External links
 Exposing Ghosts of the Past, Michael Rakowitz Pulls Back the Curtain, Hyperallergic
 Michael Rakowitz Recreates a Sculpture Destroyed by ISIS for London’s Trafalgar Square, Hyperallergic
 Michael Rakowitz remakes looted Iraqi antiquities with a modern message, The Los Angeles Times
 An Artist Honors Tamir Rice, One Orange Object at a Time, The New York Times (July 31, 2018): C2.
Complicated Collections, Williams Magazine 114, no. 3 (Spring 2020): 18–23.
 

American people of Iraqi descent
American conceptual artists
Jewish American artists
Northwestern University faculty
American people of Iraqi-Jewish descent
1973 births
Living people
21st-century American Jews